Lowerhouse Cricket Club is a cricket club in the Lancashire League, which plays its home games at The Brooks Foundation Ground on Liverpool Road in Burnley.

In recent years the club has been very successful, winning the league in 2011, 2012 and 2014, the Worsley Cup in 2004, 2012, 2018 and 2021 and the Twenty20 Cup in 2013. The club won the league for the first time in 2005, captained by Joe Beneduce, having won the cup for the first time the year before, captained by Matt Hope. It has employed professionals including Matthew Mott, Ryan Harris, Martin van Jaarsveld, Jacques Rudolph,  and Peter Fulton.

For the 2022 season the captain is Benjamin Heap, and the professional is Stephen Parry.

History
A team called Lowerhouse played on a field near the former Griffin Hotel on Rossendale Road between 1855 and 1861. When it was dissolved, three new teams were founded. However in 1863, the three teams merged again to re-form Lowerhouse Cricket Club. For many years they were still known as the Garibaldians, after one of the teams started in 1862. When in 1874, the club employed Gibson Price as the professional, he also worked as the groundsman. By 1890, the club's finances had improved to a point that two professionals were employed. The membership rose from 93 in 1882, to 570 in 1915.

Honours
1st XI League Winners - 4 - 2005, 2011, 2012, 2014
Worsley Cup Winners - 4 - 2004, 2012, 2018, 2021
20/20 Cup Winners - 1 - 2013
Ron Singleton Colne Trophy Winners - 2 - 2012, 2022 (shared)
2nd XI League Winners - 3 - 1900, 1923, 1927
2nd XI (Lancashire Telegraph) Cup Winners - 2 - 1973, 1982
3rd XI League Winners - 2 - 2004, 2014

See also
Burnley Cricket Club - another Lancashire League team from Burnley

References

External links
Lowerhouse Cricket Club official site
Lancashire League Club Directory

Lancashire League cricket clubs
Sport in Burnley